1996 in Ghana details events of note that happened in Ghana in the year 1996.

Incumbents
 President: Jerry John Rawlings
 Vice President: Kow Nkensen Arkaah
 Chief Justice: Isaac Kobina Abban

Events

January

February

March
6th  - 39th independence anniversary held.

April

May

June

July
1st - Republic day celebrations held across the country.

August

September

October

November

December
Annual Farmers' Day celebrations held in all regions of the country.
7th - Presidential and parliamentary elections held.

Births

 January 3: Koby Arthur, footballer

Deaths

National holidays
 January 1: New Year's Day
 March 6: Independence Day
 May 1: Labor Day
 December 25: Christmas
 December 26: Boxing day

In addition, several other places observe local holidays, such as the foundation of their town. These are also "special days."

References

 
Years of the 20th century in Ghana
Ghana
1990s in Ghana
Ghana